The Second Encirclement Campaign is an abbreviated name used for several different encirclement campaigns launched by the Nationalist Government with the goal of destroying the developing Chinese Red Army and its communist bases in several separate locations in China during the early stage of Chinese Civil War between the late 1920s to mid-1930s, and these are:

Second Encirclement Campaign against Jiangxi Soviet, April 1, 1931 to May 31, 1931
Second Encirclement Campaign against Hubei-Henan-Anhui Soviet, April 1931 to July 1931
Second Encirclement Campaign against Honghu Soviet, March 1, 1931, to early June, 1931
Second Encirclement Campaign against Hubei-Henan-Shaanxi Soviet, February 1935 to April 18, 1935
Second Encirclement Campaign against Shaanxi-Gansu Soviet, April 1935 to July, 1935